Poqomchiʼ may refer to:

 Poqomchiʼ people, an ethnic group of Guatemala
 Poqomchiʼ language, a Mayan language